Wetland is a 2021 Spanish thriller film directed by Iñaki Sánchez Arrieta which stars Raúl Arévalo and Paz Vega alongside Joaquín Climent, Roberto Álamo and Susi Sánchez.

Plot 
A biologist returns to his native land amid a dire drought episode and tries to protect the environment, but he meets opposition from the locals.

Cast

Production 
The film was produced by Sunrise Pictures alongside El Lodo la película AIE, in association with Telespan 2000, with participation of À Punt Media and support from the Institut Valenciá de Cultura. It was shot in the natural park of La Albufera and its surroundings.

Release 
The film screened as the opening film of the 36th  in October 2021. Distributed by Vértice, it was initially slated for a 29 October 2021 theatrical release in Spain. The release date was eventually postponed to 10 December 2021.

Reception 
Toni Vall of Cinemanía rated the film 3½ out of 5 stars, underscoring it to be a "magnetic tale of scattered violence and social criticism".

Manuel J. Lombardo of Diario de Sevilla scored 2 out of 5 stars assessing that the film gets bogged down in its own redundancies amid dramatic effects and a sensationalist drift.

Elsa Fernández-Santos of El País considered that the film contributes nothing to the environmental dilemma posed by Susi Sánchez' character and "remains in the trite and superficial metaphor of the muddy waters, of the primitive men of the countryside versus those of the city".

Raquel Hernández Luján of HobbyConsolas scored 68 out of 100 points ("acceptable"), writing that the film "works well as a wake-up call on environmental issues and manages to exploit the landscapes to create an unsettling atmosphere", while citing as negative points that the thriller side of the film works in fits and starts and that there are overacted secondary characters detracting from the story.

Accolades 

|-
| align = "center" rowspan = "10" | 2021 || rowspan = "10" | 4th Berlanga Awards || Best Actress || Paz Vega ||  || rowspan = "10" | 
|-
| Best Actor || Joaquín Climent || 
|-
| Best Supporting Actress || Susi Sánchez || 
|-
| Best Supporting Actor || Roberto Álamo || 
|-
| Best Original Music || Xema Fuertes, Amadeo Moscardó || 
|-
| Best Production Supervision || José Jaime Linares || 
|-
| Best Editing || Marta Salas || 
|-
| Best Cinematography and Lighting || Guillem Oliver || 
|-
| Best Sound || Dani Navarro, Iván Martinez Rufat  || 
|-
| Best Costume Design || Giovanna Ribes  || 
|}

See also 
 List of Spanish films of 2021

References 

2021 thriller films
Spanish thriller films
Films shot in the province of Valencia
Films about water scarcity
2020s Spanish-language films
2020s Spanish films